Stade Samuel Mbappé Léppé formally Stade Akwa is a multi-use stadium in Douala, Cameroon.  It is currently used mostly for football matches. It serves as a home ground of Kadji Sports Academy. The stadium holds 4,000 people. Its namesake is Samuel Mbappé Léppé.

References

External links
Stadium profile - Soccerway.com

Football venues in Cameroon
Buildings and structures in Douala